Hans Müller, Mueller or Muller may refer to:

 Hans Müller von Bulgenbach (c.1490-1525), peasant leader during the German Peasants' War
 Hans Müller (politician) (1884–1961), German politician (CSU)
 Hans Müller (chess player) (1896–1971), Austrian chess player
 Hans Müller (aviator) (1896–1964), World War I flying ace
 Hans Müller (boxer) (1916-1967), Swiss Olympic boxer
 Hans Karl Müller (1892–1977), World War I flying ace
 Hans Mueller (physicist) (1900–1965), physicist and professor
 Hans Müller (director) (1909–1977), German film and television director
 Hans Müller (physician) (1910–1994), physician working in China
 Hans Müller (figure skater) (1931-2021), Swiss figure skater and coach
 Hans Müller (pentathlete) (born 1947), Swiss Olympic pentathlete
 Hans Müller (motorcyclist) (born 1949), Swiss Grand Prix motorcycle racer
 Hansi Müller (Hans-Peter Müller, born 1957), German former football player
 Hans Robert Müller (1911–1999), Austrian mathematician
 Hans Muller (water polo) (1937–2015), Dutch water polo player

With double names 
 Hans Müller-Einigen (1882–1950), German language playwright, added the Swiss village of Einigen to his name
 Hans J. Müller-Eberhard (1927–1998), German-American molecular immunologist
 Hans-Wilhelm Müller-Wohlfahrt (born 1942), German doctor of sports medicine

See also
 Johann Müller (disambiguation)
 Johannes Müller (disambiguation)